Jo Parkerson is a British broadcast journalist.

Life
Her credits include time presenting a Saturday afternoon show on London based talk station LBC between 3pm and 6pm. She was also the station's "Showbiz" editor. She used to have her own show on Galaxy Digital which was on Sunday afternoons between 1pm and 4pm, and took a look back at the previous week's highlights in the showbiz world.

References 

Year of birth missing (living people)
Living people
British radio DJs
British radio personalities
British journalists